The striated bulbul (Alcurus striatus) is a species of songbird in the bulbul family, Pycnonotidae.

It is found from the eastern Himalayas to northern Vietnam. Its natural habitat is subtropical or tropical moist montane forests.

Taxonomy and systematics
The striated bulbul was originally described in the genus Tricophorus (a synonym for Criniger) and it was later transferred to Pycnonotus, before its latest reassignment. Alternate names for the striated bulbul include the striated green bulbul and striped bulbul.

Subspecies
Three subspecies are recognized:
 A. s. striatus - (Blyth, 1842): Found in the eastern Himalayas, north-eastern India, southern China and western Myanmar
 A. s. arctus - Ripley, 1948: Found in the Mishmi Hills (north-eastern India)
 A. s. paulus - Bangs & Phillips, JC, 1914: Found in eastern Myanmar, southern China and northern Indochina

Gallery

References

striated bulbul
Birds of Bhutan
Birds of Nepal
Birds of Northeast India
Birds of Myanmar
Birds of Yunnan
striated bulbul
striated bulbul
Taxonomy articles created by Polbot